Ramasamy Dharmar is an  Indian politician, and a member of the Rajya Sabha, the upper house of the Parliament of India, from Tamil Nadu, as a member of the All India Anna Dravida Munnetra Kazhagam.

References

All India Anna Dravida Munnetra Kazhagam politicians
Living people
Year of birth missing (living people)
Rajya Sabha members from Tamil Nadu
People from Tamil Nadu